Fresa (Spanish for "strawberry") or Eres Fresa, is a slang, socially used in Mexico and some parts of Latin America  to describe a cultural stereotype of superficial youngsters who, by the traditional definition of the word, came from an educated, upper-class family. The word was originally used by teenagers and young adults alike. Nowadays, its use has spread to all age groups.

Fresas are typically seen to be stand-offish and use a mixture of Spanish, and English or "Spanglish." Having an accent, similarly as if one had " la papa en la boca," having a potato in your mouth. The term fresa may be considered synonymous with the term preppy, which originated in the United States in the 1960s to define teenagers with a conservative mentality who did not drink and proudly displayed their social status. In Mexico, during the 1970s, the meaning changed and became a term to describe the lifestyles of the youth who were wealthy and well-known.

However, the current usage of the term in Mexico has its origins in the late 1980s. During the rapid change in society as a result of globalization, which brought new forms of fashion, food and entertainment into the culture, a number of Mexican people began to adopt the "preppy" American lifestyle by mimicking American styles of dress, mannerisms and etiquette. Some examples include wearing polo shirts, boat shoes and chinos. The colloquialisms used by fresas are often referred to as "fresa talk".

It was at this time when the toy doll Strawberry Shortcake (Rosita Fresita) came to the scene in Mexican toy stores all over the country. It became very popular among girls, especially those amongst the upper middle and upper class. Younger Mexicans began teasing each other using the term, you are too sweet like Strawberry Shortcake (eres más dulce que Rosita Fresita). Rosita Fresita became the symbol of being cheesy in relation to being too polished, in the way you talk, you dress, etc... It was also closely related to the color pink, a color that was more relatable to girls in the upper class. So much was the case that wearing the color pink as a man became as a symbol of status, of being ¨fresa¨ like Rosita Fresita (Strawberry Shortcake).

Sociolinguistic use

Ever since it has come into use, the term has referred to the specific lifestyles, behaviors, habits, and other characteristics that have no specific relation to economic status or ethnicity, but that somehow became factors of the phenomenon when these lifestyles and habits required certain aspects that can only be found in an upper class circle. Although it is not critically necessary because belonging to a fresa group pertains to the way one thinks and acts. People that call themselves "fresas", are usually not part of it, but rather a false attempt to belong in that group. That is to say, 'authentic' fresas do not exist, although some people naturally think, behave, and act the stereotype without noticing it, and they find it completely normal. The term has been made popular in other Latin American countries due to international popularity of TV shows with fresa characters. In Venezuela there is another word for the same people, which is "cotufa", which literally means popcorn. Supposedly, the reason for this term is due to the comparison of "one's brain to a piece of popcorn", but this term has its differences from the word "fresa". The term "cotufa" is actually more like the "dumb blonde" trope, but in Venezuela hair color is not a deciding factor as people with other hair colors may also have similar traits. A closer term would be the word "sifrina", because it is directly related to rich, spoiled girls.

Fresa is sometimes considered the stereotypical opposite of naco, however it is not always a derogatory word. Traditionally, teens who attend expensive schools or have wealthy parents (and are more likely to be fresas) are called "niños bien" (fine children) or "gente bien" (fine people). The fresa accent is also different from the typical slow-spoken Mexican accent of some regions, with a higher established accent and different tone. While originally, most of the educated high class regarded as fresas had a proper vocabulary in concordance with their education, upbringing and status, nowadays fresas have a way of speech that is considered frivolous and many times uneducated by the intellectual elite (composed of people from all social classes). The fresa clothing mostly consists of top, mainstream brands such as: Abercrombie & Fitch, Hollister Co., Lacoste, Armani as well as other expensive clothing brands, and can usually be seen shopping in well located shopping centers (malls) and always paying with cards instead of cash.

Things go back to the late 70s and 80s when (for the first time in Mexican society) kids, teenagers and even young adults started using stereotypically "fresa" behavior as a way of giving a false impression (deceiving) of their real social, economical (& educational) status. Since then, such tendency prevailed as a mainstream among the Mexicans until recent (and rather counter) new subcultures have risen and replace it, such as "Emos", "Goths", "Darks", "Punketos", "Tech-savvy teens", "Metrosexuals", "Barrio", "Chuntaros", "Bronies", "Rancholos", "Cosplayers", etc. (although there are many still stuck in the "Fresa" style).
Back in those days, it was a "privilege" to be mistaken as a "Fresa". The copycats rapidly spread all over the country, and knock-offs replaced the quality of the original brands for cheap ones that deceived passing out as "originals". The brands of choice of the "Fresas" were Dolce & Gabbana, Zara, Polo Ralph Lauren, Furor, Abercrombie & Fitch, Reebok, Lacoste, Tommy Hilfiger, Ray-Ban Wayfarer, Banana Republic, Hugo Boss, Guess, Levi's, Puma, Armani, Calvin Klein, American Eagle, among others.
The bands and artists of choice, whose influence bred and helped expand the phenomenon were "Timbiriche", "Flans", "Maná", "Luis Miguel", "Sasha", "Pandora", "Mecano", "RBD", "Kudai" etc. The places of choice were "The News Pedregal", "The Magic Circus", "Plaza Satelite", "Perisur", Santa Fe, "Plaza Inn", "Chazz", "El Ajusco", among others. Besides, as a part of every subculture, a "characteristic" dance was born: the "wavy", in which one would remain standing, sort of bouncing from left to right and all the way round while miming a "wavy" move with the opposite arm (lifted about the shoulder's level parallel to the floor). The magazine "Eres" was one of the most popular and influential among adolescents, and the radio station "WFM 96.9" was certainly locally important and popular.

Fresa as a subculture

Fresas have become something of a subculture in contemporary Mexico; like metalheads and punks, they dress in a certain way, speak in a certain way and live in a certain way. They are an abundant and very influential subculture with little or no knowledge of what happens outside their circles. But since the mid-1990s the hip hop and reggaeton scenes have been taking over Mexico and other Latin American countries.

Fresas are mostly stereotyped as frivolous, self-centered and pretty much unintelligent; mostly as zombies who swirl through life solely thinking about superficial matters. However and in some cases notwithstanding, some are actually part of the social, economic, and intellectual elite of the country.  For example, this particular group has more people per capita who speak a second language, usually English. Some of the people who fall into this category also come from families with both political and corporate influence.  Nevertheless, the most clear indicator of the synthetic origin of the fresa subculture and speech/accent is perhaps the fact that although longstanding members of the high class and middle class elites,  the fathers and/or grandfathers of the fresa have either standard or educated regional accents and more traditional attitudes, cultural viewpoints and dressing codes.

The word fresa is somewhat pejorative outside the fresa circles. Being called a fresa, for example, in a punk subculture could be considered an insult, as many of the people in other subcultures absolutely abhor fresas, and use the term as an insult.

The term fresa however, is scarcely used outside the self-proclaimed fresa circles (basically composed by people from the high and middle classes), as many people who are actually part of some social, economical or intellectual elite don't view themselves as fresas and simply see the word as a term to describe their lifestyle; they view themselves simply as "normal" people and refuse to label themselves as something, even though people outside could see them as such. Rarely, if ever, will you hear people from these elites not inside fresa circles call themselves or another one a fresa. They will on occasion refer as a fresa to one another as a form of satire.

Fictional fresas

 A well-known "fresa" is the fictional persona El Pirrurris, created by comedian Luis de Alba, a parody of the so-called juniors, the young and presumptuous children of Mexican politicians and entrepreneurs. Although this character is overacted and doesn't exactly match the real life fresa standards, he is often mentioned as a reference.
 Jose Emilio Pacheco, in his novel "Las Batallas en el Desierto" written in 1981, exposes a series of characters that accurately represent diverse social Mexican subcultures from which we can have a more precise understanding of some social aspects in real-life interaction to comprehend how really several groups are.
 In the Mexican telenovela Soñadoras Angélica Vale plays Julieta, a teenager of lower middle class origins who often poses as a high society person by behaving like a fresa.
 In the Mexican film Amar te duele the character Renata and her group of friends would be considered fresas.
In the Mexican telenovela "Amor en Custodia" the character Bábara.
In the Mexican telenovela "Teresa" the characters Paulo and Aída.
In the Mexican telenovela "Rebelde" the character Mía Colucci, and also Sol de la Riva.
In the Mexican telenovela "Una familia con suerte" the characters Freddy and Monica are considered fresas.
In the Mexican telenovela "Amores verdaderos" the character Nicole "Nikki" Brizz
The Mexican family television sitcom "Una familia de Diez" the character Martina is considered fresa by the viewers; her own family considered the same, especially by her cousin "La Nena", who always uses "fresa" as an insult because they aren't rich and she is only posing.

See also
 Jewish American Princess
 Naco (slang)
 Old money
 Yuppie

References

Pejorative terms for people
Mexican culture
Mexican slang
Mexican youth culture
Social class subcultures
Age-related stereotypes
Stereotypes of the upper class
Social class in Mexico